Frederik Pleitgen (born 1976) is a German journalist and correspondent for CNN International.

Pleitgen studied North American studies at the University of Bonn and at Free University Berlin. Pleitgen also spent one year studying at the School of Journalism at New York University. He worked for German television broadcasters ZDF and RTL as well as German news channel n-tv before joining CNN in 2006. In Paris, he covered the aftermath of the Charlie Hebdo shooting.

Pleitgen lives in Berlin. He is the son of German journalist and former director of the public West German Broadcasting Corporation, Fritz Pleitgen.

Filmography

Recognition
 2017 Hanns Joachim Friedrichs Award

References

External links
 CNN Programs – Anchors/Reporters – Frederik Pleitgen

German male journalists
21st-century German journalists
German broadcast news analysts
1976 births
CNN people
RTL Group people
ZDF people
Living people
German television reporters and correspondents
University of Bonn alumni
Free University of Berlin alumni
New York University alumni
German expatriates in the United States
Writers from Cologne
German male writers